Allahabad Bypass Expressway is an  Controlled-access highway located in the district of Allahabad. It is the Asia's longest bypass in terms of length. The project is a section of National Highway 19. It forms the part of the Golden Quadrilateral, under the Kanpur-Allahabad-Varanasi section of Delhi-Kolkata stretch. The primary purpose of construction was to reduce heavy traffic on the Grand Trunk Road through the city of Allahabad.

Construction
The total work was divided into 3 contract packages. Construction of road from Km. 158 to 198 (except the Ganges Bridge) was taken up by the National Highways Authority of India with loan assistance from the World Bank. A nearly kilometer long bridge on Ganga was also constructed as a part of the project

Exits/Interchange

The four-laned bypass expressway has 5 exits, including the 2 terminals, that continue as National Highway 2 towards Kanpur and Varanasi. From geographically West to East, the exits are:
 Kokhraj Terminal Exit: Continuing as NH-2 from Kanpur. Exits To Allahabad City/Bamrauli and Fatehpur/Kanpur.
 Lucknow Road Exit: Interchange for NH 24B. Exits to Allahabad City and Lucknow/Rai Barreli.
 Faizabad Road Exit: Interchange for NH 96. Exits to Allahabad City and Pratapgarh/Sultanpur/Faizabad.
 Gorakhpur Road Exit: Interchange for SH 7. Exits to Allahabad City and Jaunpur/Azamgarh/Gorakhpur.
 Handia Terminal Exit: Continues as NH-2 towards Varanasi. Exits To Allahabad City/Jhunsi and Varanasi/Bhadohi.

See also
Expressways of India

References

Transport in Allahabad district
Expressways in Uttar Pradesh